This is a list of members of the Victorian Legislative Council at the election of 4 June 1907, up to the election of 2 June 1910. As half of the Legislative Council's terms expired at each triennial election, half of these members were elected at the 1904 triennial election with terms expiring in 1910, while the other half were elected at the 1907 triennial election with terms expiring in 1913.

The Electoral Provinces Boundaries Act 1903 defined 17 Provinces with two members each for a total of 34 members.

Note the "Term in Office" refers to that members term(s) in the Council, not necessarily for that Province.

Henry John Wrixon was President; Arthur Sachse was Chairman of Committees.

 Austin died 30 November 1909; replaced by Thomas Carthew Miners in December 1909.
 Fitzgerald died 17 August 1908; replaced by George Dickie in September 1908.

References

 Re-member (a database of all Victorian MPs since 1851). Parliament of Victoria.

Members of the Parliament of Victoria by term
20th-century Australian politicians